Saint-Alexis-de-Matapédia is a village and municipality in the Gaspésie–Îles-de-la-Madeleine region of eastern Quebec, Canada.

In addition to Saint-Alexis-de-Matapédia itself, the municipality also includes the communities of Léonard-de-Matapédia and Saint-Benoît-de-Matapédia.

In 2003, the Parish Municipality of Saint-Alexis-de-Matapédia became the Municipality of Saint-Alexis-de-Matapédia.

History

Demographics

Population

See also
 List of municipalities in Quebec

References

External links
 Official website

Municipalities in Quebec
Incorporated places in Gaspésie–Îles-de-la-Madeleine